French is the official language in Gabon, however 32% of the people speak Fang as a mother tongue. 
French is the medium of instruction. Before World War II very few Gabonese learned French, nearly all of them working in either business or government administration. After the war, France worked for universal primary education in Gabon, and by the 1960-61 census, 47% of the Gabonese over the age of 14 spoke some French, while 13% were literate in the language. By the 1990s, the literacy rate had risen to about 60%.

It is estimated that 80% of the country's population can speak the language competently and one-third of residents of Libreville, the capital city, had become native French speakers. More than 10,000 French people live in Gabon, and France predominates the country's foreign cultural and commercial influences. Outside the capital, French is less commonly spoken, though it is used by those who have completed a secondary or university education.

The indigenous languages are all members of the Bantu family, estimated to have come to Gabon about 2,000 years ago, and differentiated into about 40 languages. They are generally spoken but not written; while missionaries from the United States and France developed transcriptions for a number of languages based on the Latin alphabet starting in the 1840s, and translated the Bible into several of them, French colonial policy officially promoted the study of French and discouraged African languages. The languages continue to be transmitted through family and clan, and individuals in cities and other areas where different people may learn several Bantu languages.

The Gabonese government sponsored research on the Bantu languages starting in the 1970s.

The three largest languages are Fang, Mbere, and Sira (Eshira), each with about 25–30% of the speakers. The remainder of the languages are single-digit percentages, and some have only a few thousand speakers.

Education for the deaf in Gabon uses American Sign Language, introduced by the deaf American missionary Andrew Foster.  (See Francophone African Sign Language.)

List of languages 
Indo-European languages
Romance languages
French (ISO code fra)
Niger–Congo languages
Beti languages
Fang (fng)
Kele–Tsogo languages
Kendell (kbs)
Sake (sag)
Seki (syi)
Sighu (sxe)
Simba (sbw)
Tsogo (tsv)
Wumbvu (wum)
Makaa–Njem languages
Bekwel (bkw)
Mbam languages
Bubi (buw)
Mbete languages
Kanin (kzo)
Nzebi languages
Duma (dma)
Tsaangi (tsa)
Wandji (wdd)
Sawabantu languages
Benga (ben)
Yasa (yko)
Sira languages
Barama (bbg)
Bwisi (bwz)
Sangu (snq)
Sira (swj), aka Eshira, Shira
Vili (vif)
Teke languages
Northern Teke (teg)
Western Teke (tez)
Vumbu (vum)
Ubangian languages
Ngbaka languages
Baka

References

External links
 Ethnologue.com report on languages of Gabon
 PanAfriL10n page on Gabon